Kuzgun may refer to:

 Kuzgun (2019 TV series)
 Kuzgun, Aziziye, Erzurum, Turkey
 Kuzgun, Karaisalı, Adana, Turkey
 Kuzgun Dam, on the Serçeme River in Erzurum, Turkey
 Kuzgun-Akhmerovo, Bashkortostan, Russia